José Alonso (born José Alonso Zepeda Palacios; 18 November 1947 in Mexico City, Mexico) is a Mexican film and telenovela actor.

Awards

Ariel Awards
The Ariel Awards are awarded annually by the Mexican Academy of Film Arts and Sciences in Mexico. José Alonso has received two awards out of five nominations.

|-
|rowspan="1" scope="row"| 1979
|scope="row"| En La Trampa
|scope="row"| Best Actor
| 
|-
|rowspan="1" scope="row"| 1992
|scope="row"| La Tarea
|scope="row"| Best Actor
| 
|-
|rowspan="1" scope="row"| 1993
|scope="row"| Bartolomé de las Casas (La Leyenda Negra)
|scope="row"| Best Actor
| 
|-
|rowspan="1" scope="row"| 1996
|scope="row"| Mujeres Insumisas
|scope="row"| Best Actor
| 
|-
|rowspan="1" scope="row"| 2001
|scope="row"| Crónica de un Desayuno
|scope="row"| Best Supporting Actor
| 
|-

Filmography

Film 

 Tajimara (1965)
 El día de las madres (1969)
 Trampa para un cadáver (1969)
 Paula (1969)
 Las bestias jóvenes (1970)
 Fallaste corazón (1970)
 La agonía de ser madre (1970)
 Las hermanas (1971)
 Tómalo como quieras (1971)
 Las reglas del juego (1971)
 Intimidades de una secretaria (1971)
 Papa en onda (1971)
 Una vez en la noche (1971)
 La derrota (1973)
 Los cachorros (1973)
 El hombre desnudo (1976)
 Los albañiles (1976)
 Mina, tiempo de libertad (1977)
 Naufragio (1978)
 María de mi corazón (1979)
 En la trampa (1979)
 Amor libre (1979)
 El vuelo de la cigüeña (1979)
 Complot Petróleo: La cabeza de la hidra (1981)
 El gran mogollón (1982)
 La fuga de Carrasco (1983)
 Motel]] (1984)
 Pesadilla (1985)
 Playa prohibida (1985)
 Trazos en blanco (1985)
 El misterio de la casa abandonada (1987)
 Sandino (1990)
 La tarea (1991)
 El bulto (1992)
 Anoche soñé contigo (1992)
 Fray Bartolomé de las casas (1993)
 Bodas negras (1994)
 Magnicidio (1995)
 Mujeres insumisas (1995)
 Mujeres infieles (1995)
 La ley de las mujeres (1995)
 Crisis (1998)
 Crónica de un desayuno (1999)
 Blind Heart (2002)
 Corazón de melón (2003)
 La gran sangre - La película (2007)
 El garabato (2008)
 Kada kien su karma (2008)
 Ángel caído (2010)

Telenovelas 

 Amor sublime (1967)
 Cuna vacía (1967)
 Leyendas de México (1968)
 Un grito en la obscuridad (1968) .... Héctor
 Cárcel de mujeres (1968)
 Simplemente vivir (1968)
 Mi maestro (1968)
  Los Caudillos (1968) .... Mina
 Rosario (1969)
 El mariachi (1970) .... Refugio
 Las máscaras (1971) .... Gaspar
 Las fieras (1972) .... Jean Brisson
 La tierra (1973) .... Alberto
 Cartas sin destino (1973) .... Fabián
 El milagro de vivir (1975).... Héctor Alvarado
 Mundos opuestos (1976) .... José Alberto de la Mora
 Cartas para una víctima (1978)
 Pasiones encendidas (1978)
 Amor prohibido (1979)  .... Manuel
 Colorina (1980) .... Iván
 El árabe (1980)  .... Ernesto Illinworth
 Una limosna de amor (1981) .... Luis Alfonso
 Gabriel y Gabriela (1982) .... Renato Reyes
 Abandonada (1985) .... Ernesto
 Monte calvario (1986).... Octavio Montero
 Senda de gloria (1987) .... Héctor Álvarez
 Tal como somos (1987) .... Ángel Cisneros
 El precio de la fama (1987) .... Sergio Ferrer
 La casa al final de la calle (1989) .... Bronski
 Alcanzar una estrella II (1991) .... Leonardo Lascuráin
 Con toda el alma (1996) .... Ítalo Linares
 Rivales por accidente (1997) .... Vladimiro
 La chacala (1998) .... Padre Isaías
 La casa del naranjo (1998)
 Háblame de amor (1999) .... Guillermo
 Tío Alberto (2000) .... Enrique Sotomayor
 Lo que es el amor (2001) .... Fausto Ocampo
 El país de las mujeres (2002) .... Don Lucio
 La hija del jardinero (2003) .... Fernando Alcántara
 Montecristo (2006) .... Horacio Díaz Herrera
 Alma legal (2008) .... Víctor
 Pasión Morena (2009) .... Adolfo Rueda
 Vidas Robadas (2010) .... Antonio Fernández Vidal
 A corazón abierto (2012) .... Don Gualberto
 Los Rey (2012) .... Pedro Malvido

References

External links

1947 births
Best Actor Ariel Award winners
Ariel Award winners
Living people
Mexican male film actors
Mexican male telenovela actors
Mexican people of Italian descent
Male actors from Mexico City